African Journal may refer to

 African Journal of Ecology
 African Journal of AIDS Research
 African Journal of Aquatic Science
 African Journal of Reproductive Health
 African Journal of Criminology and Justice Studies
 African Journal of Health Sciences
 African Journal of Marine Science
 African Journal of Range & Forage Science
 African Journal of Urology
 African Journal of Infectious Diseases
 African Journal of International Affairs
 African Journal of Economic Policy
 African Journal of Biomedical Research